Julius Hirschberg (18 September 1843 – 17 February 1925) was a German ophthalmologist and medical historian. He was of Jewish ancestry.

In 1875, Hirschberg coined the term "campimetry" for the measurement of the visual field on a flat surface (tangent screen test)  and in 1879 he became the first to use an electromagnet to remove metallic foreign bodies from the eye. In 1886, he developed the Hirschberg test for measuring strabismus. His series Geschichte der Augenheilkunde (History of Ophthalmology), nine volumes written from 1899 to 1917, is considered by some to be one of his greatest achievements.

Selected publications
 
 Vol. 1. Geschichte der Augenheilkunde im Alterthum
 Vol. 2. Geschichte der Augenheilkunde im Mittelalter
 Vol. 3. Die vernehmlichsten Augenärzte und Pfleger der Augenheilkunde im 18. Jahrhundert und ihre Schriften
 Vol. 4. Deutschland's Augenärzte, von 1800 bis 1850
 Vol. 5. Frankreichs Augenärzte, von 1800 bis 1850
 Vol. 6. Englands Augenärzte, von 1800 bis 1850
 Vol. 7. Italiens Augenärzte, von 1800 bis 1850
 Vol. 8, Part A. Die Augenärzte der Schweiz, von 1800 bis 1850; Die Augenärzte Belgiens, von 1800 bis 1850; Niederländische Augenärzte, von 1800 bis 1850; Die Skandinavischen Augenärzte, von 1800 bis 1850; Die Augenärzte Rußlands, von 1800 bis 1850; Polnische Augenärzte, im 19. Jahrhundert; Die Augenärzte in der Iberischen und der Balkan-Halbinsel, sowie in den Außereuropäischen Ländern während des Neunzehnten Jahrhunderts
 Vol. 8, Part B. Amerikas Augenärzte im 19. Jahrhundert

Notes

External links

Pubmed
Snyder C. "Julius Hirschberg, the neglected historian of ophthalmology." Am J Ophthalmol. 1981 May;91(5):664-76.  .
Biro I. "[In memory of Julius Hirschberg.]" Orv Hetil. 1976 Aug 8;117(32):1953-4. .
Koelbing HM. "[Julius Hirschberg (1843-1925), ophthalmologist and medical historian (author's transl).]" Klin Monatsbl Augenheilkd. 1976 Jan;168(1):103-8. .

1843 births
1925 deaths
19th-century German Jews
German ophthalmologists
Jewish scientists